This is a comprehensive list of state-level professional soil science associations in the United States. There is a US Consortium of Soil Science Associations that strives to increase work, communication and corporation between these associations and other soil scientist associations.lun

Associations

A
Alabama - Professional Soil Classifiers Association of Alabama
Alaska/Yukon Society of Professional Soil Scientists
Arizona
Arkansas Association of Professional Soil Classifiers

C
California - Professional Soil Scientists Association of California
Colorado
Connecticut - Society of Soil Scientists of Southern New England

D
Delaware

F
Florida Association of Environmental Soil Scientists

G
Georgia - Soil Science Society of Georgia

H
Hawaii

I
Idaho Soil Scientists Association 
Illinois Soil Classifiers Association
Indiana Association of Professional Soil Classifiers
Iowa Association of Professional Soil Classifiers

K
Kansas Association of Professional Soil Classifiers 
Kentucky Association of Soil Classifiers

L
Louisiana

M
Maine Maine Association of Professional Soil Scientists
Maryland Maryland Association of Professional Soil Scientists
Massachusetts - Society of Soil Scientists of Southern New England
Michigan - Soil Classifiers Association of Michigan
Minnesota Association of Professional Soil Scientists
Mississippi - Professional Soil Classifiers Association of Mississippi 
Missouri Association of Professional Soil Scientists
Montana - none found

N
Nebraska Association of Professional Soil Scientists 
Nevada
New Hampshire Association of Natural Resource Scientists
New Jersey
New Mexico Association of Professional Soil Scientists
New York -  Empire State (New York) Pedologists 
North Carolina - Soil Science Society of North Carolina 
North Dakota - Professional Soil Classifiers Association of North Dakota

O
Ohio - Association of Ohio Pedologists
Oklahoma Professional Soil Science Association of Oklahoma
Oregon Soil Science Society

P
Pennsylvania Association of Professional Soil Scientists

R
Rhode Island - Society of Soil Scientists of Southern New England

S
South Carolina Professional Soil Classifiers 
South Dakota Professional Soil Scientists Association of South Dakota

T
Tennessee-  Soil Scientists' Association of Tennessee
Texas Professional Soil Scientists of Texas Association

U
Utah Society of Soil Scientists

V
Vermont 
Virginia  Virginia Association of Professional Soil Scientists

W
Washington Society of Professional Soil Scientists
West Virginia Association of Professional Soil Scientists
Wisconsin Society of Professional Soil Scientists
Wyoming

See also
National Cooperative Soil Survey

References
United States Consortium of Soil Science Associations

 State
Soil science-related lists
Soil science associations
Soil science, United States, by state
Associations, United States, by state